St. Francis Xavier's Girls' School & College is a Bengali-medium Catholic secondary school in the Old Dhaka area of Dhaka, Bangladesh.  It is operated by the Sisters of Our Lady of the Missions, a Roman Catholic religious order.

See also

 Catholic Church in Bangladesh
 Education in Bangladesh
 List of schools in Bangladesh

References

Old Dhaka
1912 establishments in India
Christianity in Dhaka
Educational institutions established in 1912
High schools in Bangladesh
Girls' schools in Bangladesh
Catholic secondary schools in Bangladesh
Schools in Dhaka District